IDEC Corporation, formerly IDEC Izumi Corporation, is a manufacturer of Automation and Control products.  The company was founded in Osaka, Japan in 1945.  IDEC was founded by Tsuneo Funaki in 1945 and it became a company organization in 1947.  IDEC is known for their various electromechanical control products such as relays, timers, and switches.  The company also manufactures automation products, such as Micro Programmable logic controllers, power supplies, and touch-screen displays.  In addition to supplying automation and control products, other divisions of the company supply sensors, bar code readers, and advanced LED opto-electronic components.

Companies based in Osaka Prefecture

The United States division is found on the web at us.idec.com.  Products include automation and related devices including Program Logic Controllers (PLC), Human Machine Interface (HMI), switches, indicators, sensors, safety, wiring terminals, lamps, relays, and other products for automation systems.  Software for programming is free with purchase of related products, and can be down-loaded for time limited use.  IDEC systems support Ethernet, Bluetooth, SCADA, email, MODBUS, FTP data transmission, remote access, monitoring and control.  The products are robust and industrial quality.

Training and support is generally hands-on through personal contact and seminars.  There is not much on-line training, but the schools and seminars include starter kits in the price and the training is thorough.  Phone and email support is generally available, and adequate, although not always accurate.